Cherokee City is an unincorporated census-designated place (CDP) in Benton County, Arkansas, United States. Per the 2020 census, the population was 73. It is the location of (or is the nearest community to) Coon Creek Bridge, which is located on Cty Rd. 24 and is listed on the National Register of Historic Places. The community was named for the Cherokee, since the Trail of Tears crossed the landscape when the Cherokee migrated west to Indian territory, now Oklahoma in the late 1830s. The town is within the Northwest Arkansas region, located about 5 miles east of Oklahoma and 4 miles south of the Missouri state line.

Demographics

2020 census

Note: the US Census treats Hispanic/Latino as an ethnic category. This table excludes Latinos from the racial categories and assigns them to a separate category. Hispanics/Latinos can be of any race.

History
Cherokee City was platted in 1880. A post office called Cherokee City was established in 1871, and remained in operation until 1953.

Education 
Public education is available from the Gentry School District, that leads to graduation from Gentry High School.

References

Census-designated places in Benton County, Arkansas
Census-designated places in Arkansas
1880 establishments in Arkansas